The Hadejia River is a river in northern Nigeria and is a tributary of the Yobe River (Komadugu Yobe). 
Among the cities and towns that lie on or near its banks are Hadejia and Nguru. 
Damming of the river for the purposes of irrigation has led to a decrease in the amount of water in the Hadejia-Nguru wetlands, which the river forms along with Nguru Lake. 
The Hadejia river is now 80% controlled by the Tiga and Challawa Gorge dams in Kano State.

References

Rivers of Nigeria
Bauchi State
Jigawa State
Kano State
Yobe State